Chuchart Trairatanapradit, popularly known as Tai Pichit (born 10 January 1963) is a Thai former professional snooker player.

Pichit participated at the World Snooker Championship three times, reaching the first round in 1995. Pichit's best overall ranking finish was at the 1994 Thailand Open, where he reached the last 16 stage.

Career 

Pichit turned professional in 1991. His first tournament was the 1991 Thailand Open, where he was eliminated 4–5 in the first round by Allison Fisher. Pichit's best run came in 1994, when he participated in the Thailand Open, beating Colin Morton and Stephen Hendry 5–2, before losing to Morgan 4–5 in the second round.

One year later, he participated at his first World Snooker Championship, qualifying for the 1995 edition of the tournament. In so doing, Pichit became the second Thai player, after James Wattana, to play at the Crucible Theatre. Pichit defeated Mark Whatley 5–3, Adrian Rosa 5–1, Mike Dunn 5–2, Warren King 10–0, Stuart Reardon 10–8, Alex Higgins 10–5, Euan Henderson 10–6 and Mike Hallett 10–8 to set up an encounter with Willie Thorne. In the event, Pichit led 2–0 and held Thorne to 4–4 and 6–7, but eventually lost 6–10.

He also participated in the 1996 UK Championship, defeating Jimmy White 9–7 in the first round, and advanced to the second round, where he was defeated by Joe Johnson 6–9.

In 1998–99, Pichit was ranked 124th, the highest ranking in his career, but ended the season at 150th, with his final tournament at the 1999 China International, where he lost 0–5 to John Giles. He lost his professional status immediately thereafter, aged 36.

Personal life 
Pichit was a Buddhist monk before he became a professional snooker player.

Performance and rankings timeline

Career finals

Pro-am finals: 2

Amateur finals: 6 (2 titles)

References

External links 
 Profile on Snooker Database

Living people
Tai Pichit
Asian Games medalists in cue sports
Cue sports players at the 1998 Asian Games
1963 births
Tai Pichit
Medalists at the 1998 Asian Games
Tai Pichit